Contraband Bayou is a large bayou which runs through Lake Charles, Louisiana and empties into Prien Lake. It is so named because of the legendary pirate Jean Lafitte who reputedly hid his contraband somewhere along the shores of the bayou. L'Auberge du Lac Resort is located near the mouth of the bayou, as are part of the city docks of the Port of Lake Charles.

References

Wetlands and bayous of Louisiana
Lake Charles, Louisiana
Rivers of Calcasieu Parish, Louisiana